Hong Kyung (born February 14, 1996) is a South Korean actor. He is best known for his role in the film Innocence (2020), which won him a Baeksang Arts Award.

Career
After graduating from Hanyang University, Hong made his acting debut with a minor role in the television series Queen of Mystery (2017) and subsequently appeared in School 2017 (2017), While You Were Sleeping (2017), and Jugglers (2017–2018). He continued to act in television series such as My Lawyer, Mr. Jo 2: Crime and Punishment (2019), D.P. (2021), and Lovers of the Red Sky (2021).

Hong made his feature film debut in Innocence (2020), for which he received critical acclaim and won a Baeksang Arts Award for Best New Actor – Film.

In February 2022, Hong moved to Management MMM after his contract with J-Wide expired.

Filmography

Films

Television series

Web series

Music video

Awards and nominations

References

External links
 
 
 

1996 births
Living people
Hanyang University alumni
South Korean male film actors
South Korean male television actors
21st-century South Korean male actors
Best New Actor Paeksang Arts Award (film) winners